Hansard TV (also known as Hansard Broadcasting Services) is the legislature broadcaster of the Legislative Assembly in the Canadian province of British Columbia. It is available on most cable television systems in the province of British Columbia, as well as Nationally on Shaw Direct channel 393 and Optik TV channel 843. The chosen name of "Hansard", refers to printed transcripts of parliamentary debates in the Westminster system government. Closed Captioning provided by the Captioning Group.
Hansard Television also manages the operation of the Saskatchewan Legislative Network, the broadcaster for the Legislative Assembly of Saskatchewan.

Music composers 
Original music themes written and produced by Tobin Stokes.

Special Events Video Archive 
The special events archives contains webcast video of such events as budget and throne speeches, parliament opening-day ceremonies and royal visits.

See also 
 Government of British Columbia
 Leader of the Opposition (British Columbia)
 Lieutenant Governor of British Columbia
 Premier of British Columbia
 Speaker of the Legislative Assembly of British Columbia

Broadcast Schedule
Hansard Television is currently Broadcasting Parliamentary of British Columbia Schedule from Monday to Thursday.
Live broadcast in the Chamber Statements by Members followed by Oral Question Period on Monday & Wednesday Afternoon then Tuesday & Thursday Morning.

External links

Commercial-free television networks
Legislature broadcasters in Canada
Politics of British Columbia
Television stations in British Columbia
Mass media in Victoria, British Columbia
Parliament of British Columbia
Television channels and stations established in 1991
1991 establishments in British Columbia